Clinical Breast Cancer is a bimonthly peer-reviewed medical journal established in 2000 and published by Elsevier. It covers all areas related to breast cancer.

Abstracting and indexing 
Clinical Breast Cancer is indexed by Index Medicus/PubMed, EMBASE Excerpta Medica, ISI Current Contents, CINAHL, Scopus, and Chemical Abstracts. According to the Journal Citation Reports, the journal has a 2017 impact factor of 2.703.

References

External links 
 

Oncology journals
Breast cancer
Publications established in 2000
Elsevier academic journals
English-language journals
Bimonthly journals